Quality Software Services,  Inc. (QSSI) is an American software services company and a subsidiary of the UnitedHealth Group, It is one of the contractors working on the website of Healthcare Marketplaces. QSSI specializes in providing management of information technology applications to federal and state governments, as well as commercial and healthcare organizations.

QSSI was founded in 1997 by Tony Singh and is based in Columbia, Maryland. It was acquired by the UnitedHealth Group in 2012.

References

External links
 

Companies based in Columbia, Maryland
Information technology companies of the United States
Defunct software companies of the United States